In Greek mythology, Eusorus (Ancient Greek: Εύσωρος) was the father of Acamas, Aenete and in some accounts, of Cyzicus.

Mythology 
Eusorus only appeared in various stories as the father of certain figures otherwise he has no myth of his own:

Apollonius' account 

 "And about the isthmus and the plain the Doliones had their dwelling, and over them Cyzicus son of Aeneus was king, whom Aenete the daughter of goodly Eusorus bare."

Hyginus' account 

 "Cyzicus, son of Eusorus, king in an island of the Propontis, received the Argonauts with generous hospitality"

Orphic Argonautica 

"Cyzicus, the son of Aeneus who ruled over all the Doliones, came up and took a place among the heroes. He had been born to a most noble woman, Aenete, daughter of Eusorus."

Apollodorus' account 

 "A period of nine years having elapsed, allies came to join the Trojans: surrounding cities,...Acamas, son of Eusorus..."

Notes

References 

 Apollonius Rhodius, Argonautica translated by Robert Cooper Seaton (1853-1915), R. C. Loeb Classical Library Volume 001. London, William Heinemann Ltd, 1912. Online version at the Topos Text Project.
 Apollonius Rhodius, Argonautica. George W. Mooney. London. Longmans, Green. 1912. Greek text available at the Perseus Digital Library.
 Gaius Julius Hyginus, Fabulae from The Myths of Hyginus translated and edited by Mary Grant. University of Kansas Publications in Humanistic Studies. Online version at the Topos Text Project.
Homer, The Iliad with an English Translation by A.T. Murray, Ph.D. in two volumes. Cambridge, MA., Harvard University Press; London, William Heinemann, Ltd. 1924. . Online version at the Perseus Digital Library.
Homer, Homeri Opera in five volumes. Oxford, Oxford University Press. 1920. . Greek text available at the Perseus Digital Library.
 Pseudo-Apollodorus, The Library with an English Translation by Sir James George Frazer, F.B.A., F.R.S. in 2 Volumes, Cambridge, MA, Harvard University Press; London, William Heinemann Ltd. 1921. . Online version at the Perseus Digital Library. Greek text available from the same website.

Characters in Greek mythology